Camama is a commune located in Belas Municipality, the province of Luanda, in Angola.

See also 

 Communes of Angola

References 

Populated places in Luanda Province